The 1999 season was the San Diego Chargers' 30th in the National Football League (NFL), their 40th overall and their first under head coach Mike Riley.

In the Chargers' first training camp in preseason, quarterback Ryan Leaf suffered a shoulder injury and missed the entire season. Following a 4–1 start, the Chargers suffered six straight losses before winning four of their final five games to finish 8–8.

Offseason

NFL draft

Personnel

Staff

Roster

Schedule

Note: Intra-division opponents are in bold text.

Game summaries

Week 2: at Cincinnati Bengals

Week 3: vs. Indianapolis Colts

Week 4: vs. Kansas City Chiefs

Week 5: at Detroit Lions

Week 6: vs. Seattle Seahawks

Week 7: vs. Green Bay Packers

Week 8: at Kansas City Chiefs

Week 9: vs. Denver Broncos

Week 10: at Oakland Raiders

Week 11: vs. Chicago Bears

Week 12: at Minnesota Vikings

Week 13: vs. Cleveland Browns

Week 14: at Seattle Seahawks

Week 15: at Miami Dolphins

Week 16: vs. Oakland Raiders

Week 17: at Denver Broncos

Standings

References

San Diego Chargers
San Diego Chargers seasons
San Diego Chargers f